The Casalmaggiore Altarpiece is a 1540 oil on panel painting by Parmigianino, now in the Gemäldegalerie in Dresden, which acquired it from the Este collection in 1746. 

It is named after Casalmaggiore, whither the artist had fled from Parma after imprisonment for non-compliance by the priors of Santa Maria della Steccata and where he spent five months before dying of a fever. It was commissioned for the church of Santo Stefano (now the Duomo) in the town and in 1846 Mortara recorded a tradition that the commissioner was Matteo Cavalli and that Cavalli is shown resting his head on Saint Stephen's leg in the bottom right hand corner of the work. A preparatory study survives in the Royal Collection at Windsor Castle, along with a drawing of the Madonna and Child for the work in the Gabinetto dei Disegni e delle Stampe in Florence.

The work remained in Santo Stefano for at least a century before the local community allowed it to be moved to the Galleria Estense in Modena, hoping this would win the Este family over to making the church a collegiate one - Correggio's Casalmaggiore Madonna was also given up on similar grounds. This transaction occurred during Francesco I d'Este's temporary occupation of the town in 1647 during his war with Spain, though its citizens had first been forewarned of the work's interest to collectors by a 1602 visit from Palmerio Celestani, an intermediary for Ferdinando Gonzaga - a letter dated 14 February 1602 states Celestani met the church's priest, who was willing to sell the work, though for an unknown reason the sale was not completed.

References

Paintings of the Madonna and Child by Parmigianino
Collections of the Gemäldegalerie Alte Meister
Paintings of Saint Stephen
Paintings depicting John the Baptist
Este collection
1540 paintings